Carla Banks (born 1999) is a Scottish international lawn and indoor bowler.

Bowls career
Banks won the 2015 Under 18 National Singles and the 2017 Under 25 National Singles.

In 2020 she was selected for the 2020 World Outdoor Bowls Championship in Australia, as the women's team travelling reserve. She made her debut at the World Indoor Championships during the 2021 World Indoor Bowls Championship and reached the mixed pairs final with Robert Paxton before losing out to Stewart Anderson and Julie Forrest in the final.

Family
Her father Colin Banks and her brother Jason Banks are both international bowlers.

References

Scottish female bowls players
1999 births
Living people